The 2015 Savannah Steam season was the second season for the American Indoor Football (AIF) franchise, and their first season in AIF.

Schedule

Regular season

*May 9 game was originally against the Atlanta Sharks, but due to its cancelation, the Maryland Eagles filled the Steam's schedule void.

Standings

Roster

References

Savannah Steam
Savannah Steam
American football in Georgia (U.S. state)